The Men's C-1 200m event at the 2010 South American Games was held over March 29 at 9:20.

Medalists

Results

References
Final

200m C-1 Men